Antonio Baldacci (born 31 May 1951) is an Italian rower. He competed at the 1972 Summer Olympics, 1980 Summer Olympics and the 1988 Summer Olympics.

References

1951 births
Living people
Italian male rowers
Olympic rowers of Italy
Rowers at the 1972 Summer Olympics
Rowers at the 1980 Summer Olympics
Rowers at the 1988 Summer Olympics
Place of birth missing (living people)